Charles Leslie Stewart MM (12 July 1880 – 21 August 1957) was an Australian rules football player and World War I veteran.

Football career
Stewart played three matches for Carlton during the 1901 VFL season. He had come to Carlton from Essendon District.

War service
Stewart was a veteran of both Gallipoli and the Western Front. Rising to the rank of acting sergeant, he was awarded the Military Medal for bravery in March 1918.

References

External links

1880 births
Carlton Football Club players
Australian rules footballers from Melbourne
Australian military personnel of World War I
Australian recipients of the Military Medal
1957 deaths
People from St Kilda, Victoria
Military personnel from Melbourne